Balk is a hamlet and civil parish in the Hambleton district of North Yorkshire, England, just east of Thirsk.  In the 2001 census the parish had a population of 48. The population of the parish was estimated at 60 in 2013.  The parish shares a grouped parish council with the adjacent parish of Bagby.

References

External links

Villages in North Yorkshire
Civil parishes in North Yorkshire